Robert Dunbar  (December 13, 1812 – September 18, 1890) was a Scottish mechanical engineer. He designed the first steam-powered grain elevator in the world and the majority of the first grain elevators in Buffalo, New York City, and Canada.

Early life 

Dunbar was born in Carnbee, Scotland. His birth is recorded as December 13, 1812. His father was William Dunbar, a mechanical engineer, came from a family line of engineers. Dunbar immigrated with his family to Pickering, Ontario, while a boy of 12. He went to high school and college in Canada. He took up an interest in mechanics and learned mechanical engineering.

Career 

Dunbar took charge of the ship yard  at Niagara, Ontario, in 1832. He renovated the docks and its machinery. Dunbar later settled in Black Rock, Buffalo, New York, in 1834. He associated himself with Charles W. Evans and constructed flourmills. With financing by entrepreneur Joseph Dart, Dunbar designed and built at Buffalo in 1842 the first steam-powered grain elevator in the world.

The invention had a profound effect on Buffalo and the movement of grains on the Great Lakes and the world:

He built nearly all the grain elevators in Buffalo which put the city as one of the largest grain markets in the United States. Dunbar built and designed the majority of the first grain elevators in Canada and New York City. He constructed other grain elevators in Liverpool and Hull in England and in Odessa, Russia. He constructed grain elevators in many other grain shipping ports around the world. Dunbar's grain elevator innovations are still in use. Dunbar was senior partner in a firm called Robert Dunbar & Son. They were grain elevator architects, engineers, and contractors. Dunbar became a wealthy man because of his innovations in grain elevators.

Family 
Dunbar married Sarah M. Howell on August 26, 1840. Two of his sons were William J. Dunbar and Robert Dunbar. A third son, George H. Dunbar, became proprietor of The Eagle Iron Works of Buffalo. He also had two daughters, Mary G. Dunbar and Emma G. Dunbar.

Death 
Dunbar died September 18, 1890.

Legacy 
He is known as "the father of the great grain elevator system."

References

External links 

1812 births
1890 deaths
Canadian inventors
Canadian mechanical engineers
Scottish inventors
Scottish mechanical engineers